Marlbrook, also known as Cherry Hill, is a historic home located near Glasgow, Rockbridge County, Virginia. The oldest section dates to about 1766, and is a two-story, five-bay Late Georgian style brick farmhouse with a -story brick east wing and a balancing frame west wing. The east wing was added in 1804 and the west wing in the 1990s. The property also includes the contributing log spring house, cistern (1870s), barn, tenant house (1945), and garage / workshop (1945).

It was listed on the National Register of Historic Places in 2002.

References

Houses on the National Register of Historic Places in Virginia
Georgian architecture in Virginia
Houses completed in 1795
Houses in Rockbridge County, Virginia
National Register of Historic Places in Rockbridge County, Virginia
1795 establishments in Virginia